The 2010 Women's Premier League Rugby season was the second season of the Women's Premier League in the United States. It began on September 11 and involved eight teams.

Format 
The teams remained the same from the 2009 season. The eight teams were divided into two conferences comprising four teams. They each played six conference games, one home and one away. The WPL season occurred in the fall, concurrently with the regular women's club season, with the National Championship being held in November 12–14.

For the Finals, teams were seeded based on the results of their conference during the regular season. The top four teams competed for the Cup and the bottom teams for the Bowl. This was the first year where promotions and relegations into the WPL were decided at the end of the season.

Conference standings

Eastern Conference

Western Conference

Matches

Week 1

Week 2

Week 3

Week 4

Week 5

Week 6

Playoffs

Bowl Semifinals

Cup Semifinals

Bowl Finals

7th Place Final

5th Place Final

Cup Finals

3rd Place Final

Grand Final

References

External links 

 USA Rugby Women's Premier League official site

Women's Premier League
Women's Premier League